Valery Fedorenko is a Russian world record kettlebell lifter and coach who founded the World Kettlebell Club in 2006. While competing in Kettlebell lifting, Fedorenko achieved the title of "Honored Master of Sport", which is the sport's highest level of recognized skill.

References

Kettlebell lifting coaches
1973 births
Living people